is located on the borders of Gifu, Ishikawa and Toyama prefectures in Japan. It is in the northern area of Hakusan National Park and is part of the Ryōhaku Mountains.

Geography 
There are three triangulation stations on the mountain's thin peak.

History 
Taichō is said to have first scaled the mountain in the early eighth century.

Gallery

References

See also 

 Hakusan National Park
 Ryōhaku Mountains
 Taichō

Mountains of Gifu Prefecture
Mountains of Ishikawa Prefecture
Mountains of Toyama Prefecture